Three ships of the Royal Australian Navy (RAN) have been named HMAS Launceston, after the city of Launceston, Tasmania.

, a Bathurst-class corvette commissioned in 1942, and transferred to the Turkish Navy in 1946
, a Fremantle-class patrol boat laid down in 1980 and decommissioned in 2006
, an Armidale-class patrol boat commissioned in 2007 and active as of 2016

Battle honours
Ships named HMAS Launceston are entitled to carry four battle honours:
 Pacific 1942–45
 Indian Ocean 1942–44
 East Indies 1944
 Okinawa 1945

References

Royal Australian Navy ship names